Kikinda Airfield ( or Aerodrom Drahslerov Salaš, Аеродром Кикинда or Аеродром Драxслеров Салаш) is a recreational airfield in Serbia, situated in the vicinity of the northern town of Kikinda (9 kilometres south-west from the town centre), close to the Subotica-Novi Sad route.

It is used mainly for sports flights of aircraft, gliders; helicopter flights and parachute jumps.

Airports in Serbia